Virgin Airways may refer to:
 Virgin Atlantic, a British airline primarily serving routes between North America and Europe
 Virgin Australia, an airline primarily servicing routes in Australia
 Virgin America, a former airline in the United States